Bothrocara is a genus of marine ray-finned fishes belonging to the family Zoarcidae, the eelpouts. They are found in the Pacific Ocean with one species reaching the southwestern Atlantic Ocean.

Taxonomy
Bothrocara was first proposed as a monospecific genus in 1890 by the American ichthyologist Tarleton Hoffman Bean when he described Bothrocara mollis from Cape St. James, in Haida Gwaii, British Columbia. This genus is classified within the subfamily Lycodinae, one of 4 subfamilies in the family Zoarcidae, the eelpouts. This genus is the sister taxon to Bothrocarina, Lycodapus and Lycogrammoides, and these four genera form a clade within the subfamily Lycodinae.

Etymology
Bothrocara is a compound of bothros, which means "pit" or "trench", and kara, meaning head, an allusion to the large pores along jaws and reaching back to the operculum in B. mollis.

Species
Species include:

A review of the genus in 2011 placed B. elongata, B. nyx and B. pusillum in the genus Bentartia and classifies B. tanakae in the monospecific genus Zestichthys.

Characteristics
Bothrocara eelpouts share the loss of an oral valve with the three sister taxa. They also share the absence of a pelvic fin and compared to other Lycodin eelpouts they do not display marked sexual dimorphism. In his original description of the genus Bean stated that it bore a resemblance to the genus Maynea but lacked teeth on the vomer and palate with the small teeth in the jaws being arranged in narrow bands with very few on the lower jaw. There are six branchiostegals and the gill membrane is narrowly attached to the isthmus. There are large pores along the jaws and these extend rearwards onto the operculum. The front part of the body is naked, with no scales. The dorsal fin has its origin over the that of the pectoral fin and is continuous with the anal fin. However, later authors state that these fish do have vomerine and palatine teeth and that most species, other than the type species, are extensively scaled.

Distributuion and habitat
Bothrocara eelpouts are mainly found in the northern Pacific Ocean with one species, B. elongatum, being found in the eastern central Pacific Ocean as far south as Chile, and another B. molle extending into the southwestern Atlantic Ocean. They are demersal fish and can be found in shallow and deep water, mainly along continental slopes.

References

External links

Lycodinae
Taxa named by Tarleton Hoffman Bean